The 1949 Arkansas Razorbacks football team represented the University of Arkansas in the Southwest Conference (SWC) during the 1949 college football season. In their fourth and final year under head coach John Barnhill, the Razorbacks compiled a 5–5 record (2–4 against SWC opponents), finished in sixth place in the SWC, and were outscored by their opponents by a combined total of 175 to 167.

The 1949 season included the first football game between Arkansas and current Southeastern Conference opponent Vanderbilt. Geno Mazzanti was the Razorbacks' leading rusher in 1949 with 757 rushing yards on 123 carries (6.2 yards per carry).  Don Logue led the team in passing, completing 31 of 79 passes for 374 yards.  Future NFL player and college football broadcaster Pat Summerall, a freshman, led the Razorbacks in receiving categories in 1949 with 17 catches for 298 yards.  Summerall also played defensive line and placekicker.

Schedule

References

Arkansas
Arkansas Razorbacks football seasons
Arkansas Razorbacks football